In mathematics, the symmetric closure of a binary relation  on a set  is the smallest symmetric relation on  that contains 

Definition 

The symmetric closure  of a relation  on a set  is given by

See also

References 

 Franz Baader and Tobias Nipkow, Term Rewriting and All That, Cambridge University Press, 1998, p. 8

Binary relations
Closure operators
Rewriting systems